Irina Rosenfeld (Mishéll, born December 10, 1988) is a singer and songwriter in the genres of R&B, jazz and soul.

Biography

Mishéll was born Iryna Talia Rozenfeld in 1988 in Kerch, USSR. She studied at the Kyiv International Institute of Music R.Glier and at the National Academy of Culture and Art Management. Mishéll reached twice (2006 and 2010) the final of Ukrainian national selection for Eurovision Song Contest. In 2013 she reached the finals of the musical reality TV in Ukraine "Your face sounds familiar”. In 2013 she released a show and album of Jewish songs in Hebrew and Yiddish.In 2019 Mishéll started the creative process of her new solo album. During 2021 she released two singles.

Awards and nominations

Discography
Irene Rozenfeld 
Yiddish Hits
Mishéll
Tonight
Never Be
Mic Is On
OK
#1
Fever
Fever-Live

References

External links
Official Website

Living people
21st-century Israeli women singers
1988 births
21st-century Ukrainian women singers